Shyju Khalid is an Indian cinematographer,  film director, and producer who works in Malayalam films. Shyju Khalid made his debut as cinematographer with Traffic (2011). His notable works are 22 Female Kottayam (2012), Idukki Gold (2013),  Maheshinte Prathikaaram (2016), Traffic (2011), 5 Sundarikal (2013), Sudani From Nigeria (2018), Ee.Ma.Yau (2018) and  Kumbalangi Nights (2019). He is a member of the Indian Society of Cinematographers (ISC). Malayalam Film Director Khalid Rahman and Cinematographer Jimshi Khalid are his brothers.

Career

In 2011, director Aashiq Abu suggested him as a cinematographer to Rajesh Pillai directed Traffic. His work received recognition through the film. His second film, Salt and Pepper (2011) was directed by Aashiq Abu. In 2012 he again worked with Abu in 22 Female Kottayam. Khalid directed a segment in the anthology film 5 Sundarikal in 2013. He has also co-produced the films Chandrettan Evideya, Kali, Sudani from Nigeria and Thamaasha under the banners Handmade Films and Happy Hours Entertainments.

Filmography

As cinematographer

As director

As producer

Awards

References

External links
 
 

Malayalam film directors
Living people
Maharaja's College, Ernakulam alumni
Film directors from Kochi
Malayalam film producers
Film producers from Kochi
Malayalam film cinematographers
Cinematographers from Kerala
Year of birth missing (living people)